The 2014–15 season was the 46th campaign of the Scottish Men's National League, the national basketball league of Scotland. The season featured 12 teams. Edinburgh University and Tayside Musketeers joined the league. Falkirk Fury won their 4th league title.

A second division was also re-introduced, featuring 7 teams. For the inaugural trial season, the league comprised the second teams of Falkirk, Edinburgh, Stirling and Boroughmuir, plus the addition of the Glasgow Rens, West Lothian Wolves and Granite City Grizzlies.

Teams

The line-up for the 2014-2015 season featured the following teams:

Boroughmuir Blaze
City of Edinburgh Kings
Clark Eriksson Fury
Dunfermline Reign
Edinburgh University
Glasgow Rocks II
Glasgow Storm
Glasgow University
St Mirren West College Scotland
Stirling Knights
Tayside Musketeers
Troon Tornadoes

League table

Playoffs

Quarter-finals

Semi-finals

Final

Scottish Cup

Preliminary round

Last 16

Quarter-finals

Semi-finals

Final

References

Scottish Basketball Championship Men seasons
Scot
Scot
basketball
basketball